Peipiaosteidae is an extinct family of fish, known from the Late Jurassic and Early Cretaceous of Asia. They are members of Acipenseriformes, related to sturgeons (Acipenseridae) and paddlefish (Polyodontidae). Fossils have been found in freshwater deposits in China, Russia, Kazakhstan, and Mongolia. They are generally considered either the earliest diverging group of Acipenseriformes, or the sister group to the clade containing Acipenseridae and Polyodontidae. At least Yanosteus was likely to have been piscivorous, based on a specimen of Lycoptera found in the mouth of one specimen.

Taxonomy 
After.

 Stichopterus Reis, 1910
 Stichopterus woodwardi Reis, 1910 Turgen Formation, Russia, Early Cretaceous
 Stichopterus popovi Jakovlev, 1977 Gurvan-Eren Formation, Mongolia, Early Cretaceous (Aptian)
 Indeterminate remains are known from the Early Cretaceous Murtoi Formation, Russia.
 Peipiaosteus fengningensis Bai, 1983
 Peipiaosteus fengningensis Bai, 1983 Yixian Formation, China, Early Cretaceous (Aptian),
 Liaosteus Lu, 1995
 Liaosteus hongi Lu, 1995 Haifanggou Formation, China, Middle-Late Jurassic (Callovian/Oxfordian)
 Spherosteus Jakovlev, 1977
 Spherosteus scharovi Jakovlev, 1977 Karabastau Formation, Kazakhstan, Middle-Late Jurassic (Callovian/Oxfordian)
 Yanosteus Jin et al., 1995
 Yanosteus longidorsalis Jin et al., 1995 Yixian Formation, China, Early Cretaceous (Aptian)

References 

Acipenseriformes
Prehistoric ray-finned fish families